The Ramanlal Nilkanth Hasya Prize, is a literary honour in Gujarat, India. It is named after renowned Gujarati writer Ramanbhai Neelkanth. The award is conferred by Gujarat Sahitya Akademi and Government of Gujarat to the Gujarati authors for their significant contribution in Gujarati humour literature. Established in 2016, the award comprises a plaque, shawl and a cash prize of Rs. 1,00,000 (one lakh).

Recipients 
Following is the list of recipients.

References 

Awards established in 2016
2016 establishments in Gujarat
Gujarati literary awards